Sarıoğlan is a town and district of Kayseri Province in the Central Anatolia region of Turkey. The mayor is Bekir Ayyıldırım (MHP).

See also
Karaözü

References

Populated places in Kayseri Province
Districts of Kayseri Province
Towns in Turkey